White Oak Creek is a stream located primarily within Brown County, Ohio.  It begins in Highland County, Ohio.

The stream was named for the white oak timber along its course.

A USGS stream gauge on the creek near Georgetown recorded a mean annual discharge of  during water years 1925-2011.

See also
List of rivers of Ohio

References

Rivers of Brown County, Ohio
Rivers of Highland County, Ohio
Rivers of Ohio